San Fernando may refer to:

People
Ferdinand III of Castile (c. 1200–1252), called San Fernando (Spanish) or Saint Ferdinand, King of Castile, León, and Galicia

Places

Argentina
San Fernando de la Buena Vista, city of Greater Buenos Aires
San Fernando, Catamarca
San Fernando del Valle de Catamarca, capital of Catamarca province
San Fernando Department, Chaco Province
San Fernando Partido, Buenos Aires Province

El Salvador
San Fernando, Chalatenango
San Fernando, Morazán

Mexico
San Fernando, Baja California, a Franciscan mission
San Fernando, Chiapas
San Fernando, Tamaulipas
San Fernando de Rosas, name of Zaragoza, Coahuila, 1827–1868
San Fernando River

Philippines
San Fernando, Bukidnon
San Fernando, Camarines Sur
San Fernando, Cebu
San Fernando, La Union
San Fernando, Masbate
San Fernando, Pampanga
San Fernando railway station (Pampanga)
San Fernando, Romblon
San Fernando, Santo Tomas, Batangas
San Fernando, Talisay, Negros Occidental

Spain
Puerta de San Fernando (Seville), a gate of the walled enclosure of Seville
Real Academia de Bellas Artes de San Fernando ("Royal Academy of Fine Art of San Fernando"), a museum and gallery
San Fernando (Madrid Metro), a station on Line 7
San Fernando, Cádiz
San Fernando de Henares, Madrid
San Fernando de Maspalomas, Gran Canaria

United States
San Antonio, founded as "San Fernando"
San Fernando (VTA), a light rail station in San Jose, California
San Fernando, Texas
San Fernando Creek, Texas
San Fernando Valley, California
San Fernando, California
San Fernando (Metrolink station)
San Fernando Line, railroad from San Fernando to downtown Los Angeles
San Fernando Road, a road that passes through San Fernando and the San Fernando Valley

Venezuela
San Fernando de Apure, Apure
San Fernando de Atabapo, Amazonas

Other places
San Fernando, Bolívar, Colombia
San Fernando, Chile
San Fernando Canton, Ecuador
San Fernando, Ocotepeque, Honduras
San Fernando, Nueva Segovia, Nicaragua
San Fernando District, Peru
San Fernando, Trinidad and Tobago

Sports
Club San Fernando, Argentine multi-sports club
CD San Fernando, Spanish dissolved football club
CD San Fernando de Henares, Spanish football club
San Fernando CD, Spanish football club
UD San Fernando, Spanish football club

Two massacres
2010 San Fernando massacre and 2011 San Fernando massacre, two massacres in San Fernando, Tamaulipas, Mexico.

See also
 Saint Ferdinand
 San Fernando Airport (disambiguation)